Stephen Kirwan "Steve" Agar (born 6 June 1968 in Saint George) is a retired track and field athlete who competed for Dominica and later Canada. At the 1996 Summer Olympic Games in the men's 1500 metres he finished eighth in his heat, failing to advance. In 1998 he got Canadian nationality. He is the brother of swimmer Francilla Agar.

Competition record

1Did not finish in the final
2Representing the Americas

Personal bests

Outdoor
800 metres – 1:51.07 (Kuala Lumpur 1998)
1500 metres – 3:36.36 (Stuttgart 1998)
One mile – 3:57.77 (Eugene 1997)
2000 metres – 5:03.57 (Prague 1997)
3000 metres – 7:48.33 (Rovereto 1998)
5000 metres – 13:35.86 (Walnut 1998)
10,000 metres – 31:53.3 (St George's 1989)
10 kilometres – 29:36 (Ottawa 1995)
Indoor
1500 metres – 3:42.34 (Sindelfingen 1997)
One mile – 4:04.31 (Montreal 1997)
3000 metres – 7:56.44 (Toronto 1993)

References

1968 births
Living people
People from Saint George Parish, Dominica
Dominica male middle-distance runners
Olympic athletes of Dominica
Commonwealth Games competitors for Dominica
Athletes (track and field) at the 1994 Commonwealth Games
Athletes (track and field) at the 1995 Pan American Games
Athletes (track and field) at the 1996 Summer Olympics
Commonwealth Games competitors for Canada
Athletes (track and field) at the 1998 Commonwealth Games
Canadian male middle-distance runners
Dominica emigrants to Canada
Dominica people of European descent
Pan American Games competitors for Dominica